New Springville is a neighborhood in Staten Island, one of the five boroughs of New York City, USA.

History
Located near the island's geographical center, the neighborhood was founded in 1680 in Karle's Neck, 
so it was later named Karle's Neck Village.
By the early 19th century, the community included a dock (on Richmond Creek) and several freshwater springs, leading to its being renamed first Springville, then later New Springville.

New Springville remained largely rural until 1964, when the E. J. Korvette department store chain opened an outlet on the site of a former chicken farm.  This was followed, in 1973, by the opening of the Staten Island Mall on the grounds of what had been a little-used airport, which changed the character of the neighborhood completely; soon adjacent land was converted to business (mostly retail) use as well. Since then, New Springville has emerged as a commercial and administrative core, rivaling St. George. New Springville has also become a major public transportation hub, second in size on Staten Island only to that of the St. George ferry terminal; six city bus routes serve the area, including one going to Brooklyn, with the terminal at the Staten Island Mall on the Marsh Avenue side (the S79). The Yukon Bus Depot was opened in the early 1980s and can accommodate 380 buses.

The neighborhood is also known for its mafia presence. Some instances:  
 On September 11, 1989, mob-connected developer Fred Weiss was shot to death outside of his girlfriend's New Springville apartment building.  Weiss was indicted, and out of fear that he would cooperate, Gambino crime family boss John Gotti ordered Weiss's murder, and delegated the work to the DeCavalcante crime family.  The hit was carried out by James Gallo and Vincent Palermo.  The murder would end up resulting in multiple convictions for members of both crime families.
 In 1992, bar owner Michael Devine was shot to death in New Springville, allegedly on orders from Colombo family boss Alphonse Persico, because he had been carrying on a relationship with Persico's wife while Persico was imprisoned.  
 In 2005, Gambino family capo Carmine Sciandra – accompanied by two Bonanno gangsters – was shot non-fatally outside of his Top Tomato supermarket by a former NYPD officer whose daughter had been an employee at the supermarket.

In addition to its explosive development as a business district, New Springville also experienced massive residential growth during the latter third of the 20th century, with thousands of single-family homes being built there, along with apartment and condominium complexes near the Staten Island Mall. In recent years, a new educational complex has been under construction near these apartments and condominiums. Completed is P.S. 58 (Space Shuttle Columbia School), an elementary school, and new intermediate and high schools have been completed.

The 19th-century LaTourette House was listed on the National Register of Historic Places in 1982.

Transportation
Although New Springville is a major transportation hub and is well served relative to many other parts of Staten Island, it still has transportation problems. The  routes serve the area, but have no late-night service. There are also 6 express bus routes: The SIM4, SIM4C, SIM4X, SIM8, SIM8X and SIM31. Until 1995, New Springville had late-night bus service on the S59 route. , however, there are no overnight buses in New Springville, the closest bus routes to New Springville during the overnight hours are the S74 bus on Arthur Kill Road at the Eltingville Transit Center to the south and the S62 on Victory Boulevard to the north. Both of these routes are very far from the residential portion of New Springville, with the S74 and S62 being located in Eltingville and Bulls Head, respectively.

Education
New Springville is served by these schools, two of which are expeditionary learning schools:
 two public elementary schools (P.S. 58 and P.S. 69),  
 two intermediate schools (I.S. 72 and the Marsh Avenue School for Expeditionary Learning), and 
 three high schools ([[Gaynor McCown Expeditionary Learning School[[College of Staten Island High School

Demographics
According to the 2010 census, the demographics of New Springville were 68% non-Hispanic White, 2% Black, 16% Asian, and 1% Multiracial. Hispanics or Latinos of any race made up 13% of the population. The neighborhood consists of the census tracts 277.02, 277.04, 277.05, and 277.06.

The median household income was estimated to be $66,931. 7.2% of the population lived below the poverty line, making it an average Staten Island community

References

Neighborhoods in Staten Island
Populated places established in 1680
1680 establishments in the Province of New York